The 1984–85 international cricket season was from September 1984 to April 1985.

Season overview

September

Australia in India

October

India in Pakistan

November

New Zealand in Sri Lanka

West Indies in Australia

New Zealand in Pakistan

England in India

January

1984–85 Benson & Hedges World Series

Pakistan in New Zealand

February

1985 Benson & Hedges World Championship Cup

March

New Zealand in West Indies

1985 Rothmans Four-Nations Cup

References

1984 in cricket
1985 in cricket